US Highway 23 (US 23)  is a north–south United States Numbered Highway that runs from Jacksonville, Florida, to Mackinaw City, Michigan. In the US state of Michigan, it is a major, north–south state trunkline highway that runs through the Lower Peninsula. The trunkline is a freeway from the Michigan–Ohio state line near Lambertville to the city of Standish, and it follows the Lake Huron shoreline from there to its northern terminus. Serving the cities of Ann Arbor and Flint, US 23 acts as a freeway bypass of the Metro Detroit area. Overall, the highway runs through rural areas of the state dominated by farm fields or woodlands; some segments are urban in character in the Ann Arbor, Flint and Tri-Cities areas. The section from Flint north to Standish also carries Interstate 75 (I-75) along a concurrency that includes a segment that carries almost 70,000 vehicles on a daily basis.

The first transportation routes along what is now US 23 in the state were sections of two Indian trails. The route of what is now US 23 follows portions of two separate trails. In the early 20th century, four different auto trail names were applied to roads now a part of the highway. These roads were included as part of two state highways in the initial state highway system in 1919. When the United States Numbered Highway System was first designated on November 11, 1926, the new US 23 replaced the other designations along its route. Since creation, the road has been moved and realigned several times. Through the 1930s and 1940s, the lakeshore routing was created to replace a path that ran further inland through the northern portion of the state. Starting in the early 1950s, various sections in the southeastern and central areas of the Lower Peninsula were upgraded to freeways, bypassing several major cities in the area. These improvements were completed by the end of the 1960s. Since then a new crossing of the Saginaw River at Zilwaukee was built to replace a drawbridge that carried the I-75/US 23 freeway over a shipping channel.

Various memorial or tourist route designations have been applied to US 23 in the state since the 1980s. The highway has been a part of the Lake Huron Circle Tour since the creation of the Great Lakes Circle Tours in 1986. The non-freeway section was designated the Sunrise Side Coastal Highway by the Michigan Department of Transportation (MDOT) in 2004 as a part of what is now the Pure Michigan Byway Program. Since 2009, it has been called the Huron Shores Heritage Route. The highway has also carried two memorial designations related to war veterans and a third related to local civic leaders since a 2001 consolidation of related legislation in the state. MDOT has listed two of the highway's bridges on its historic bridge list, one of which is also on the National Register of Historic Places (NRHP). Future improvements to the route of US 23 include a proposed northerly extension of the freeway from Standish to one of several locations along the Lake Huron shoreline. Another freeway has been proposed in the Flint area that could connect US 23 directly to the south end of I-475.

Route description
US 23 runs for  through the Lower Peninsula of Michigan, serving as a freeway bypass to the west of Metro Detroit and a scenic highway  through the northern portion of the state along Lake Huron.  Between Flint and Standish, US 23 runs concurrently with I-75; the combined freeway section from Flint to Bay City can contain between six and eight lanes total while the rest of the US 23 freeway is mostly four lanes. Non-freeway segments of US 23 in the state are two lanes. Like other state trunkline highways, it is maintained by the Michigan Department of Transportation (MDOT). All of US 23 in the state south of the M-32 junction in Alpena has been listed on the National Highway System, a network of roads important to the country's economy, defense, and mobility. From the Standish area north, the highway is also a part of the Lake Huron Circle Tour and the Huron Shores Heritage Route, a Pure Michigan Byway.

Southeastern Michigan

US 23 enters Michigan on a freeway northwest of Toledo, Ohio, concurrent with US 223. This freeway runs north through farm fields in rural western Monroe County near Lambertville. South of Dundee, US 23 crosses the River Raisin before coming to an interchange with M-50 next to the Cabela's store west of town. North of town, the freeway passes near an industrial area. Farther north, it crosses a line of the Ann Arbor Railroad near Azalia as the trunkline runs to the east of Milan at the Monroe-Washtenaw county line. North of Milan, the freeway crosses a line of the Norfolk Southern Railway.

The landscape takes on a more suburban residential character as the freeway approaches the Ann Arbor area. There are separate interchanges for US 12 (Michigan Avenue) and I-94 on the southeast side of the city. Between I-94 and Washtenaw Avenue, US 23 carries the Business Loop I-94 (BL I-94) moniker as well. That secondary designation leaves the freeway and runs west on Washtenaw Avenue into downtown Ann Arbor and the campus of the University of Michigan. At the same interchange, a Business US 23 (Bus. US 23) designation also follows Washtenaw Avenue to the west; east of US 23, M-17 follows Washtenaw Avenue and connects the freeway with Ypsilanti. North of this interchange, US 23 crosses the Huron River near the campus of the local community college and continues north to a junction with the M-14 freeway. The two merge and run westward along the north side of the city before US 23 turns north and M-14 curves south.

North of Ann Arbor, the freeway runs through woodlands and near several lakes and features a flex route system allowing traffic to use the inner shoulder during peak times. In the community of Whitmore Lake, US 23 crosses into Livingston County near the city's namesake body of water. East of Brighton, the freeway intersects I-96 and continues north to an intersection with M-59 south of Hartland. The highway turns northeasterly by Runyon Lake and runs toward the city of Fenton. The trunkline passes through town and bends back toward the northwest, running between lakes Ponemah and Fenton. Continuing north, the environment around US 23 transitions to rural farm fields as the freeway approaches the south side of the Flint area.

Flint and the Tri-Cities area

West of Grand Blanc, US 23 meets I-75, and the two freeways merge near the Bishop International Airport and continue along the west side of the Flint metro area. I-75/US 23 has an interchange with I-69 near the crossing with the Canadian National Railway line. Continuing northwards through suburban residential areas, the highway crosses the Flint River while running along the west side of the city. In Mount Morris Township, the freeway intersects the northern end of I-475 before meeting M-57 near Clio. The highest traffic totals along US 23 in the state of Michigan were recorded by MDOT near the M-57 interchange; in 2009 an average 68,800 vehicles used that section of freeway daily. These traffic counts are expressed in terms of annual average daily traffic (AADT), which is a statistical calculation of the average daily number of vehicles on a segment of roadway.

Near Birch Run, the highway turns northwesterly next to a large outlet mall. Between here and the Saginaw area, the freeway runs through more wooded lands, crossing the Cass River near Bridgeport. I-75/US 23 enters the Tri-Cities (named for Saginaw, Bay City and Midland) when it bypasses Saginaw to the east. The freeway intersects M-46 in Buena Vista Township south of the junction with I-675. North of downtown Saginaw, the freeway crosses the Saginaw River on the Zilwaukee Bridge, a "post-tensioned, segmental, [concrete] box girder bridge" that is "infamous" for a series of "construction mishaps, cost overruns, and government foibles."

Past the bridge, I-75/US 23 meets the northern end of I-675 and continues through fields and woods to the Bay City area. At exit 162, the freeway meets the eastern terminus of US 10 and the western terminus of M-25 west of downtown. The next interchange north is with the Connector M-13 (CONN M-13) freeway, which was the previous northern end of US 23's freeway in Michigan. The connector runs due northward, and I-75/US 23 turns northwesterly to bypass around Kawkawlin. The highway veers north, crosses the Kawkawlin River and the Pinconning Creek before coming to an interchange southwest of Standish. There, US 23 curves east, separating from I-75. The lowest AADT along any freeway section of US 23 in Michigan is the section immediately east of I-75; here the traffic levels drop from 20,763 to 4,466 vehicles per day after US 23 separates from I-75.

Northern Michigan
US 23 runs north from the end of its freeway along Huron Road through the community of Standish. The trunkline turns northeasterly  through lakeshore woodlands after the intersection with Old M-76. Northeast of this intersection, the highest, non-freeway AADT level on US 23 was recorded by MDOT at 16,757 vehicles daily. Running through Omer, the highway crosses the Rifle River and a line of the Lake State Railway. In between the two crossings, it curves due east on its way out of town. At Hale Road, US 23 meets the southern end of M-65 before it continues east to Au Gres, where it runs along the Saginaw Bay and crosses the Au Gres River. Huron Road meanders northward along the lakeshore, staying inland near Point Lookout. US 23 runs through woods as it follows the Saginaw Bays shoreline northeasterly through Alabaster to Tawas City. The highway intersects the eastern terminus of M-55, runs north and east around Tawas Bay to East Tawas and follows the Lake Huron shoreline to Oscoda. Through this area, US 23 runs parallel to the Lake State Railway and crosses into the Huron National Forest.

Oscoda is the location of the eastern termini of both the River Road National Scenic Byway and County Road F-41. In between those two junctions, the highway crosses the Au Sable River near its mouth, and the trunkline passes by the former Wurtsmith Air Force Base. Huron Road continues north, running next to Van Etten Lake as it leaves the national forest. Further north, it runs along Cedar Lake when it crosses into Alcona County. The highway meets the eastern termini of F-30 and M-72 in Greenbush and Harrisville respectively. It also passes Harrisville State Park in the latter community. The highway shifts a bit further inland north of Harrisville, continuing to parallel the railroad through the Mackinaw State Forest. Near Ossineke, the trunkline turns back toward the lake, running along the shoreline of Thunder Bay.

When US 23 enters Alpena, it follows State Street through town and turns northwesterly on Chisholm Street. The intersection of Chisholm and Washington streets marks the eastern terminus of M-32. Chisholm Street runs along the Thunder Bay River and crosses the river near Lake Besser. The highway leaves town and runs through rural woodlands to the south shore of Long Lake, curving around the eastern side of the lake. Near the northern end of the lake, US 23 crosses into Presque Isle County and runs along the west shore of Grand Lake. At the north end of that lake, the highway turns west along the Lake Huron shoreline near Thompson's Harbor State Park. The trunkline continues to Rogers City where it bypasses town to the south and west, intersecting F-21 and M-68 in the process; Bus. US 23 runs through downtown. On the other side of Rogers City, US 23 runs along the lake past Hoeft State Park and along Hammond Bay before crossing into Cheboygan County. This area had the lowest AADT levels in 2009 at 1,097 vehicles per day.

US 23 follows the Lake Huron shoreline through Cheboygan County through woodlands past Cheboygan State Park and Duncan Bay. On the eastern edge of Cheboygan the highway intersects F-05 before following State Street through a commercial district. State Street crosses the Cheboygan River on the Cheboygan Bascule Bridge near the mouth of the river and the dock for the USCGC Mackinaw. On the west side of the river, US 23 meets the northern terminus of M-27 at the intersection with Main Street. State Street continues westerly as C-66 as US 23 turns north on Main Street for a block before resuming west on Mackinaw Avenue. The highway continues along the lake toward Mackinaw City. As it approaches the village, it passes Historic Mill Creek State Park and several motels. At Nicolet Street in town, the highway crosses into Emmet County for the short distance to the highway's national northern terminus at I-75's exit 338.

History

Early history

Before Michigan became a state, the first land transportation corridors were the Indian trails. The original Shore Trail ran roughly parallel to the route of the modern US 23 from the Bay City area to Cheboygan. Another section of the current highway followed the Saginaw Trail between Flint and Saginaw.

Later, during the auto trail era, the modern US 23 also coincided with the east branch of the Dixie Highway and part of the Lower Peninsula section of the Theodore Roosevelt International Highway. The Dixie Highway was created by William S. Gilbreath after he developed the Lincoln Highway. The highway was designed to link the Great Lakes with the Gulf of Mexico, and to commemorate a half century of peace between the North and the South after the American Civil War. At the urging of Governor Woodbridge N. Ferris, the northern terminus was located at the Straits of Mackinac. The highway had two branches in the Lower Peninsula; the eastern branch followed what later became US 23 north of Standish. The Theodore Roosevelt International Highway was named for former US president Theodore Roosevelt after his death in 1919. Overall, this highway ran from Portland, Oregon, to Portland, Maine, by way of Michigan and the Canadian province of Ontario. In Michigan, it also followed US 23 north of Standish.

The highway was also part of the East Michigan Pike, designed to be a counterpart of the West Michigan Pike on the other side of the Lower Peninsula. The original route of the East Michigan Pike included a section along the coast of The Thumb between Bay City and Port Huron and used the same route as the Dixie Highway north of Bay City. Backers of this auto trail lost out in terms of name recognition to the Dixie Highway, relegating the East Michigan Pike to the list of failed auto trails. The southern part of what is now US 23 in the state was also part of the auto trail craze. The Top of Michigan Trail was designated in 1917 from the state line north to the Bay City area, before turning inland along other roadways. The name faded from shortly after the time the Michigan State Highway Department (MSHD) assigned the first highway numbers in the state.

The first state highways along the US 23 corridor were numbered M-65 from the Ohio line north to the Flint area and M-10 from Flint north to Mackinaw City by July 1, 1919. When originally designated, M-65 was in two sections: the southern segment ran from the Ohio state line north to the Dundee area; the northern section ran between Ann Arbor and Flint by way of Brighton and Fenton. The gap between the two segments was eliminated by the middle of 1926.

United States Numbered Highways
US 23 was commissioned on November 11, 1926, with the debut of the United States Numbered Highway System. The MSHD removed the M-10 and M-65 designations from the highway at the time. As it was originally designated, US 23 crossed into Michigan from Ohio south of Temperance and ran north to Ypsilanti via Ida and Maybee. Once the highway entered Ann Arbor, it followed the roads that preceded the modern freeway up to Flint. From Flint to Saginaw, US 23 ran concurrently with US 10. On the way north to Bay City, the highway ran on the west side of the Saginaw River before turning north to the Standish area. From Standish to Mackinaw City, US 23 initially took a more inland route through the northeastern Lower Peninsula.

Starting in 1929, MSHD started updating the route that US 23 followed through the Lower Peninsula. Late that year, the routing was moved to the east side of the Saginaw River, and M-47 was extended along the former course on the west side of the river. During 1930, a set of changes realigned the highway's route through the southeast corner of the state. Near Ida, US 23 was rerouted along M-50 to Dundee and north through Milan to Ann Arbor, bypassing Maybee and Whittaker. US 23 was moved from its inland routing between Omer and Tawas City via Whittemore to follow a shoreline alignment by way of Au Gres along Saginaw Bay around 1932; the former route through Twining and Whittemore became an extension of M-65 and the section from Whittemore east to Tawas City was added to M-55 as a part of these changes.

In 1932, US 23 was moved closer to the lakeshore between Spruce and Alpena; the former routing was redesignated M-171.  The highway was also moved to a route closer to the lakeshore between Tawas City and Oscoda, with part of the old inland route taking the designation Old US 23. A few years later in 1936, US 23 replaced M-72 between Oscoda and Harrisville and followed a new roadway north to the Spruce area. The M-171 designation was removed from its original routing and applied to the 1932 routing of US 23 by way of Mikado and Lincoln. In the middle of 1937, US 27 was extended concurrently along US 23 between Cheboygan and Mackinaw City. Around the end of the decade, US 23's routing was moved in another location to follow the lakeshore; this time the highway was rerouted between Alpena and Rogers City. M-65 was extended northwards from Lachine through Posen to terminate over the former US 23 routing.

US 23 was moved to its current lakeshore routing between Rogers City and Cheboygan in 1940, and M-33 was extended westerly from Onaway to Afton and north to Cheboygan over the former US 23 roadway while M-68 was extended eastward through Onaway to Rogers City. In early 1941, a bridge across the Saginaw River connecting Salzburg and Lafayette avenues in Bay City was added to the route of US 23 in the city; at the same time the former routing was redesignated Bus. US 23. The highway was also realigned between Hartland and Fenton in 1941. By 1945, the northernmost segment of M-65 in downtown Rogers City was redesignated Bus. US 23, and M-65 was truncated to its junction with US 23 southeast of town, removing the concurrency that existed since 1940. North of Dundee, a more direct alignment to Azalia was added to US 23, turning the former routing back to local control in late 1947 or early 1948; at the same time, the last gravel section of the highway was paved near Hammond Bay in northwestern Presque Isle County.

Freeway conversion

One of the first pieces of what would later become part of US 23's freeway route was completed in late 1951 or early 1952, when a two-lane bypass was built around the eastern side of Milan. Two years later, a similar bypass was built from Bridgeport to M-81 on the east side of Saginaw, with the old route becoming a Bus. US 23 designation. Both bypasses would later be upgraded to four-lane freeways by 1961, with the Saginaw one later incorporated into the route of I-75. When the Mackinac Bridge opened on November 1, 1957, US 23, US 27 and US 31 were extended along the access roadways to the foot of the bridge.

The first future freeway portion of US 23 was built in 1957 from north of Ann Arbor to Whitmore Lake as a divided highway. On June 30, 1958, the first stretch of the "Fenton–Clio Expressway" opened, stretching from Fenton to Birch Run. The freeway connection from Dundee south to Ohio was opened on October 1, 1959. In late 1959, the portion from Flint to Birch Run also gained the I-75 designation.

In late 1960 or early 1961, a new I-75/US 10/US 23 freeway was built from the north end of the Saginaw bypass to Kawkawlin, utilizing the Zilwaukee drawbridge (later replaced by the Zilwaukee Bridge) over the Saginaw River; when it opened, MSHD extended M-13 along the former route of US 23 from the northside of Saginaw into Bay City to the end of the freeway at Kawkawlin. Another section connected the Whitmore Lake area with Brighton in the same timeframe. General Motors was bidding in 1961 to construct an electronic highway.  US 23 between Ann Arbor and Toledo was under consideration to be the location of this project; the testing for such a roadway was ultimately done at Ohio State University instead. By the end of the year, freeway sections opened to bypass Saginaw south and ran south to Birch Run, another connected south from Fenton to Hartland, and a third connected Milan with Dundee. The remaining gaps  were eliminated with additional freeway openings in 1962: Brighton to Hartland opened in September, and Milan to Ann Arbor opened in November. The I-75/US 23 freeway north of the Kawkawlin area to Standish opened in 1967, and M-13 was shown on maps following US 23's former route through Linwood and Pinconning after the change.

The MSHD requested additional Interstate Highway mileage in 1968 under the Federal-Aid Highway Act of 1968 including a freeway along US 23 between Standish and Mackinaw City. This extension was rejected by Congress on December 13, 1968; instead, Michigan was allotted additional mileage for an extension of I-69 to Flint. Once the last piece of I-75 was completed along the M-76 corridor in November 1973, the I-75 designation was extended north of Bay City on US 23.

The MSHD first proposed a realignment of US 223 in 1965; this change would reroute that highway to replace M-151 in southern Monroe County, and use the US 23 freeway to connect to Sylvania, Ohio. The rerouting change was made in 1977 when Michigan shifted its segment of US 223 as proposed twelve years prior. Instead of running south through Ottawa Lake, US 223 continued east  to the US 23 freeway and south into Ohio.

The original bridge across the Saginaw River at Zilwaukee was built in 1960 as a bascule bridge to allow shipping traffic to use the river. Opening the drawbridge would back traffic up on I-75/US 10/US 23 for upwards of four hours on holiday weekends. Approved in 1974, construction on the replacement bridge started in October 1979. A major construction accident in August 1982 delayed completion of the new Zilwaukee Bridge; a bridge pier partially collapsed when contractors overloaded a section under construction. The affected  deck segment tilted to rest  higher on one end and  lower on the other. The structure was originally supposed to cost $76.8 million with a 1983 completion date; in the end it cost $131.3 million (equivalent to $ in ) when the southbound span finally opened on September 19, 1988. The structure is the largest segmental concrete bridge in the country.

While that construction was being done, MDOT truncated US 10 at Bay City in 1986; this removed the concurrency between US 10 and US 23 that existed since 1926. A few years later in 1992, the freeway concept for the northeastern LP was revived again when MDOT initiated plans to study and build a new US 23 freeway from Standish northerly to Tawas City, Oscoda or Alpena. This proposal was brought up due to a high level of tourist traffic along the current routing since the mid-1960s. The FHWA mandated additional environmental studies for the project in 2000, and MDOT withdrew the proposals two years later.

In November 2016, construction work on a $92 million project began on the freeway between Ann Arbor and Whitmore Lake. This construction includes replacement of bridges and reconstruction of off ramps. A year later, the flex route system opened, using intelligent traffic management and electronic signs to monitor and redirect traffic. The system can open a temporary travel lane on the inner shoulder during rush hour. The flex route project was nationally recognized by American Association of State Highway and Transportation Officials (AASHTO) in 2018 for Operations Excellence. A $150 million extension to the interchange with I-96 is scheduled to begin in 2023 and be completed the following year.

In March 2022, construction work began at the northern end of the freeway portion of US 23 just south of the city of Standish. This will remove a bridge and on-ramp at the end of the freeway, replacing it with a roundabout.

Future
Officials in the Flint area have proposed extending a freeway to directly connect  I-475 to US 23. Such an extension, if built, would "include a new freeway coming out of I-475, which would snake across Fenton and Cook roads before connecting into US 23 at Baldwin Road". Proposals for the freeway connection have been around since the late 1990s, but they were indefinitely postponed in 2011.

Memorial highway designations and tourist routes
Most of US 23, along with US 2 in the Upper Peninsula, has been designated the United Spanish War Veterans Memorial Highway. The designation was conferred in Public Act 207 of 1945, with companion legislation for US 2 in 1949. Signs marking the highway were not erected until 1968 when Governor George W. Romney had them installed.

North of Standish, US 23 is a part of the Lake Huron Circle Tour (LHCT). This tour was created in May 1986 as part of the overall Great Lakes Circle Tour through a joint effort between MDOT and its counterparts in Wisconsin, Minnesota and Ontario.

When the Michigan State Legislature consolidated the statutes defining the various memorial highways in 2001, they included the Veterans of World War I Memorial Highway in the law. Defined along I-75/US 23 between Saginaw and Bay City, the designation was included in Public Act 142. That act also affected another previously designated moniker between the two cities. The Roberts-Linton Highway was named in 1931 for local leaders who championed the construction of a highway along the Saginaw River. This name was applied to the original highway routing between Saginaw and Bay City (now a part of M-13). After the 2001 change, the name was moved to the US 23 freeway.

In May 2004, the highway north of Standish was named the Sunrise Side Coastal Highway, a scenic highway designation through what is now called the Pure Michigan Byway Program. Since 2009, they local committee that manages the byway designation has started using the Huron Shores Heritage Route name for the corridor. At the end of 2011, the Northeast Michigan Council of Governments (NEMCOG) was working on funding a tourist promotion called "Telling Stories of the Sunrise Coast" through the US 23 Heritage Route Interpretive Program. Past efforts by NEMCOG included print media, logos, and other marketing efforts.

Historic bridges
MDOT maintains a listing of the historic bridges in the state; along US 23, the department has listed two structures. The bridge over the Ocqueoc River in Ocqueoc Township in Presque Isle County was built in 1937. The  structure is one of the last three deck truss bridges in the state. The bridge was reconstructed in 1994.

The second bridge is the Cheboygan Bascule Bridge in Cheboygan. This bascule bridge was built in 1940 over the Cheboygan River as the last of its kind before World War II. It was built as a "two-leaf bridge in a place where a single-leaf bridge probably would have sufficed." The initial construction of the structure was delayed when the contractor died, but it was completed in December 1940. It was the second moveable bridge on the site, replacing an iron swing bridge built in 1877. There are also pedestrian sidewalks on either side of the roadway. When the bridge is opened to allow river traffic to pass, boats have a  channel for navigation. The bridge was added to the National Register of Historic Places on December 1, 2000, and reconstructed in 2003.

Exit list

See also

Business routes of U.S. Route 23 in Michigan

Notes

References

External links

US 23 at Michigan Highways
The Tug-of-War that is the US 23 Freeway at Michigan Highways

US 23 at AARoads
Discover Heritage Route 23 (Northeast Michigan Council of Governments)

23
Lake Huron Circle Tour
Freeways and expressways in Michigan
Transportation in Monroe County, Michigan
Transportation in Washtenaw County, Michigan
Transportation in Genesee County, Michigan
Transportation in Saginaw County, Michigan
Transportation in Bay County, Michigan
Transportation in Arenac County, Michigan
Transportation in Iosco County, Michigan
Transportation in Alcona County, Michigan
Transportation in Alpena County, Michigan
Transportation in Presque Isle County, Michigan
Transportation in Cheboygan County, Michigan
Transportation in Emmet County, Michigan
 Michigan